Mayfair is an English brand of cigarettes, currently owned and manufactured by Gallaher Group, a subsidiary of Japan Tobacco.

History
Mayfair was launched in 1992 with the slogan "A good smoke at a fair price". The brand is Gallaher Group's leading value cigarette brand. Mayfair is one of the least expensive cigarette brands in the UK, despite its name presumably being chosen to evoke the glamour of Mayfair, the famous London district.

By 2007 Mayfair had become the second most popular cigarette brand in the UK, with total sales of £663 million.

In 2012, the brand's 20th anniversary, JTI introduced a limited edition pack, from 1 August, for two months only, with packs feature a modern new background and a 3-D crest, as well as the introduction of a "20 Years of Quality" message on-pack and a coloured inner foil.

Markets
Mayfair is mainly sold in the United Kingdom and Ireland, but also is, or was, in Austria, Portugal, Spain, Italy, Poland, Greece, Australia and Canada.

Products
The brand is available in seven versions; Mayfair White King Size, Mayfair Original Blue King Size and Superkings, Mayfair Sky Blue King Size and Superkings.  Mayfair also did a Menthol cigarette called Mayfair Green, sold in King Size and Superkings, until they got discontinued in May 2020 due to the EU menthol ban. After the menthol ban, Mayfair introduced a new cigarette, Mayfair New Green, a non-menthol alternative.

See also
 Tobacco smoking
 Health effects of tobacco

References

Gallaher Group brands
Japan Tobacco brands
British brands